Ramkesh Meena (born 15 August 1957) is an Indian politician. He is a member of 13th and 15th Legislative Assembly of Rajasthan. He has been appointed as an advisor to the present Chief Minister of Rajasthan, Ashok Gehlot. He is also the state president of Rajasthan Adivasi Meena Seva Sangh. He is a member of the Indian National Congress. He has also been a member of Bahujan Samaj Party in the past.

Personal life
He received his master's degree in M.A.(History) from Rajasthan University in 1982.

Political career
Meena is an Indian politician serving as Member of 15th Rajasthan Legislative Assembly. In the 2018 general election, he defeated his nearest Bharatiya Janata Party candidate Mansingh Gurjar by 10,000 votes.

Positions held

Other positions held

References

External links 
 

Living people
1957 births
Rajasthan MLAs 2018–2023
Indian National Congress politicians from Rajasthan